Richard Lee Gordon (born June 7, 1987) is a former American football tight end. He was drafted by the Oakland Raiders in the sixth round of the 2011 NFL Draft. He played college football at the University of Miami.

Professional career

Oakland Raiders
Gordon was drafted by the Oakland Raiders in 2011 and would later sign with the team.

Pittsburgh Steelers
On October 15, 2013, Gordon was signed by the Pittsburgh Steelers. On December 7, 2013, he was waived.

Kansas City Chiefs
On December 18, 2013, Gordon was signed by the Kansas City Chiefs. On August 31, 2014, he was waived.

Tennessee Titans
On October 22, 2014, Gordon was signed by the Tennessee Titans. On November 26, 2014, he was waived.

Kansas City Chiefs (second stint)
On December 1, 2014, Gordon was signed by the Kansas City Chiefs. On March 13, 2015, he was re-signed. On September 5, 2015, he was placed on injured reserve. On September 14, 2015, he was released from injured reserve.

Denver Broncos
On October 14, 2015, Gordon was signed by the Denver Broncos. On October 17, 2015, he was released. On October 19, 2015, he was re-signed by the Broncos. On December 1, 2015, he was released once again to make room for Josh Bush.

Baltimore Ravens
On December 15, 2015, Gordon was signed by the Baltimore Ravens. He was released on December 24, 2015.

Return to the Broncos
On February 22, 2016, Gordon signed with the Broncos, marking his return with the team. He was released on May 4, 2016.

References

External links
Oakland Raiders bio
Miami Hurricanes bio

1987 births
Living people
People from Miami Gardens, Florida
Miami Norland Senior High School alumni
Players of American football from Miami
American football tight ends
Miami Hurricanes football players
Oakland Raiders players
Pittsburgh Steelers players
Kansas City Chiefs players
Tennessee Titans players
Denver Broncos players
Baltimore Ravens players